Written in Blood may refer to:

 Written in Blood (Cheap Sex album), a 2006 street punk album
 Written in Blood (Darkness Divided album), a 2014 metalcore album
 Written in Blood (novel), a 1994 crime novel by Caroline Graham